The 2017 Malian Première Division is the 52nd edition of the highest club level football competition in Mali. It started on 4 February 2017.

The championship was abandoned in December. No title was awarded and no clubs were relegated.

Standings at abandonment

References

External links
Soccerway

Mali
Malian Première Division seasons
football